The 1956 SANFL Grand Final was an Australian rules football competition.   beat  81 to 65.

References 

SANFL Grand Finals
SANFL Grand Final, 1956